The 1995–96 Belarusian Extraliga season was the fourth season of the Belarusian Extraliga, the top level of ice hockey in Belarus. Four teams participated in the league, and Polimir Novopolotsk won the championship.

Standings

External links 
 Season on hockeyarchives.info

Belarusian Extraleague
Belarusian Extraleague seasons
Extra